Alfred Harrison Saylor (December 31, 1911 – April 8, 1955), nicknamed "Greyhound", was an American Negro league pitcher for the Birmingham Black Barons in the 1940s.

A native of Blytheville, Arkansas, Saylor was on the mound for the Black Barons' Game 1 and Game 5 victories in the 1943 Negro World Series, but took the loss in the deciding Game 8. He died in Cleveland, Ohio in 1955 at age 43.

References

External links
 and Seamheads
 Alfred Saylor at Arkansas Baseball Encyclopedia

1911 births
1955 deaths
Birmingham Black Barons players
People from Blytheville, Arkansas
Baseball players from Arkansas
Baseball pitchers
20th-century African-American sportspeople